Charles Hall (died 1 December 1669) was an English politician who sat in the House of Commons  in 1654 and 1656.

Hall was probably the son of Thomas Hall of Barlow Lees, Derbyshire. He matriculated from Trinity College, Cambridge at Easter 1619 and was admitted at Lincoln's Inn on 15 November 1619.

In 1654, Hall was elected Member of Parliament for Lincolnshire in the First Protectorate Parliament and was re-elected MP for Lincolnshire in 1656 for the Second Protectorate Parliament. 
 
Hall died in 1669 and was buried at Kettlethorpe.

References

1669 deaths
Alumni of Trinity College, Cambridge
Place of birth missing
Year of birth missing
English MPs 1654–1655
English MPs 1656–1658